Accor S.A. is a French multinational hospitality company that owns, manages and franchises hotels, resorts and vacation properties. It is the largest hospitality company in Europe, and the sixth largest hospitality company worldwide. 

Accor operates in 5,300 locations in over 110 countries. Its total capacity is approximately 777,714 rooms. It owns and operates brands in many segments of hospitality: Luxury (Raffles, Fairmont, Sofitel), premium (MGallery, Pullman, Swissôtel), midscale (Novotel,  Mercure, Adagio), and economy (ibis, hotelF1). Accor also owns companies specialized in digital hospitality and event organization, such as onefinestay, D-Edge, ResDiary, John Paul, Potel & Chabot and Wojo.

The company is headquartered in Issy-les-Moulineaux, France, and is a constituent of the CAC Next 20 index in the Paris stock exchange.

History

From Novotel to Accor 
In 1967, Paul Dubrule and Gérard Pélisson founded the hospitality group Société d'investissement et d'exploitation hôteliers (SIEH) and opened the first Novotel hotel outside Lille in northern France.

In 1974, the first Ibis hotel was launched in Bordeaux, France. Ibis was then considered a light version of Novotel. In 1975, Novotel-SIEH acquired the restaurant brand  and the Mercure hotels. In 1980, Novotel-SIEH acquired the Sofitel hotels (43 hotels). In 1981, Novotel-SIEH entered the Asian market with the opening of a Novotel in Singapore.

1983: Birth of Accor
In 1983, Novotel-SIEH acquired and merged with the group Jacques Borel International to create the Accor group, which was introduced to the Paris stock exchange the same year. Accor is based on the word "Accord" meaning "agreement" in French.

In 1984, Accor bought the Quiberon thalassotherapy center, which became the first of the Thalasso Sea & Spa brand, and acquired the fine catering company Lenôtre the following year. In 1985, the firm launched Formule 1, a brand of low-cost hotels. The buildings themselves were modular blocks manufactured in factories and assembled onsite to minimise costs.

In 1990, the firm acquired the economy lodging company Motel 6 (536 motels in the United States). In 1991, it acquired the Compagnie Internationale des Wagons-Lits, which owned Pullman Hotels and Resorts, Altea, and Europcar. Accor also launched another economy hotel,  Etap Hotel. In 1994, it merged the Compagnie Internationale des Wagons-Lits with Carlson Travel Network to create Carlson Wagonlit Travel (now CWT).

"Asset-light" realignment 

In the mid-90s, Accor shifted its interest towards  luxury and premium brands, and moved towards an asset-light model to focus  on brand and product management, rather than property management. Economy and midscale brands remained the group's cash cow and enabled it to invest in less profitable but strategic upscale and luxury brands.

In 1997, the firm acquired the casino company SPIC, which became Accor Casino. In 1999, it acquired the US-based economy lodging company Red Roof Inn (322 hotels), and announced the creation of Accor Economy Lodging to bring Motel 6 and Red Roof Inn under one roof. Along with Colony Capital, it acquired the hotel brands Libertel and Demeure (40 properties in Europe). Accor settled in the United Kingdom with the opening of a Sofitel in the previous Cox & Co bank in Central London.

Accor launched the 3-star hotel brand SuiteHotel in 1999. In 2000, Accor took full control of Century International Hotels and Zenith Hotels International in Asia, bringing its number of hotels to 200 in the Asia-Pacific zone. The Sofitel Philadelphia (former Philadelphia Stock Exchange Building) was inaugurated, the first Sofitel to open in the US in a decade. Accor bought 20% of the Polish hotel company Orbis. In 2002, Accor settled in Mexico. In 2004, Accor bought a 28.9% stake in the French all-inclusive holidays company Club Méditerranée.

In 2005, Gilles Pélisson, nephew of Accor's co-founder Gérard Pélisson, became chairman and CEO.  The investment firm Colony Capital invested 1 billion euros in Accor. The firm sold its shares of Club Med in 2006 and Red Roof Inn in 2007.

New multi-brand strategy 

In 2007, Accor launched the serviced-apartments brand Adagio in a 50/50 venture with Pierre & Vacances, relaunched Pullman as a premium hotel brand, and the Australian All Seasons as a global midscale hotel brand. In 2008, it launched the MGallery collection of upscale "personality" hotels. In 2010, reviews from TripAdvisor were embedded on some of Accor's property websites, a first in the industry.

In November 2010, Gilles Pélisson was replaced by Denis Hennequin at the head of Accor. Accor split its hotel activities from its voucher activities, Accor Services (which became Edenred and was listed on the stock exchange). Suitehotel was merged with Novotel.

In 2011, Accor revamped the ibis brand by creating ibis Styles (formerly All Seasons) and ibis budget (formerly Etap Hotel). The group sold the fine catering group Lenôtre, and the Compagnie Internationale des Wagons-Lits. In 2012, the group launched the regional premium brand Grand Mercure in China (MeiJue), and sold Motel 6. In 2013, Accor redefined its group business model on two core competencies: hotel operator and brand franchisor (HotelServices), and hotel owner and investor (HotelInvest). The group acquired the premier apartment hotel brand The Sebel.

In August 2013, Sébastien Bazin became chairman and CEO of Accor. He introduced a new economic model around two poles: HotelServices, which operates and franchises hotels, and HotelInvest, which owns hotels and leads investments.

In 2014, Accor bought a 35% share in Mama Shelter (5 hotels) whose chief designer is Philippe Starck, and  signed a strategic alliance with the China Lodging Group (Huazhu Hotels Group - 1900 hotels) to develop its hotel brands in China.

Brand portfolio expansion 

In June 2015, Accor changed its name to AccorHotels and announced a new digital strategy to federate its brands.

The firm acquired FRHI Hotels & Resorts in 2015, owner of the Fairmont, Raffles, and Swissôtel luxury hotels. In 2016, AccorHotels acquired the concierge and loyalty service John Paul, the London-based short-term vacation rental company onefinestay, 30% of the German 25hours Hotels, and 30% of the Miami-based accommodations provider Oasis. The firm also launched Jo&Joe in 2016, a new hotel brand aimed at millennials, and  signed a strategic alliance with Singapore's Banyan Tree. HotelInvest was spun off. In 2017, AccorHotels acquired the B2B hotel service provider Gekko, the private sales website for hotel deals VeryChic, and merged Squarebreak and Travel Keys into onefinestay, and launched the MoodMatch app on its website through a partnership with Travelsify. In 2017, AccorHotels also acquired 50% of the Orient Express brand in a move to relaunch it as a luxury hotel brand.

In 2017, the group announced its strategic intention (dubbed Accor Local) to broaden its marketing  to locals, instead of targeting only visitors and travelers. It also diversified its portfolio of assets with the acquisition of the fine catering company Potel & Chabot, and the event and entertainment organization company Noctis (renamed Paris Society).

In 2018, AccorHotels sold 55% of HotelInvest for €4.4 billion and renaming it AccorInvest and launched a tender offer to take full control of Orbis. It acquired the Mantra Group (134 hotels under the brands Mantra, Peppers, Breakfree, Art Series), the Mövenpick Hotels & Resorts (84 hotels in 27 countries), and the restaurant reservation and table management company ResDiary. AccorHotels partnered with Katara Hospitality to set up a $1-billion Africa-focused investment fund. China Lodging Group bought 4.5% of AccorHotels.

In 2019, AccorHotels changed its name back to Accor and launched a new loyalty program, ALL, for "Accor Live Limitless".

2020s 

The 21c Museum Hotels acquired the previous year were added to the MGallery collection, giving Accor eight new properties in the US. Accor merged its previously acquired digital marketing companies for hotels Availpro and Fastbooking to create D-Edge Hospitality Solutions, and took full control of Orbis (Its subsidiary AccorInvest acquired 98.6% shares of Orbis). Accor launched the new midscale hotel brand Tribe. After buying 50% of the SBE Entertainment Group (owner of Mondrian Hotels) in October 2018, Accor and SBE jointly launched the luxury hotel brand The House of Originals, and the premium hotel brand Hyde in Australia. In September 2019, Accor launched its first environment-conscious hotel brand, greet, with the first hotel opened in April that year in Beaune. On 3 December 2019, Accor repositioned its brand as ALL - Accor Live Limitless. The update merged Accor and its loyalty offering Le Club into one unified brand, ALL.

In the wake of the COVID-19 pandemic, Accor created CEDA (Coronavirus Emergency Desk Accor), a platform centralizing needs and providing accommodation solutions  France for front-line medical staff and vulnerable populations. The group allocated 70 million euros to launch the ALL Heartist Fund which was designed to assist employees and individual partners experiencing great financial difficulties. Accor and the certification agency Bureau Veritas launched a label guaranteeing high safety and cleanliness measures in the group's hotels and restaurants, and signed a strategic partnership with the insurance company Axa to provide medical assistance to the guests of its hotels worldwide.

In 2020, Accor opened more than 200 new hotels including its flagship Raffles Bali. On 22 October 2020, it announced its partnership with BNP Paribas to launch a joint payment card exclusively in Europe. On 24 November 2020, it announced that it is taking full ownership of SBE's Hotel assets (except Hudson Hotel in New York and Delano in Miami) as part of its simplification and asset-light strategy. In parallel, Sam Nazarian takes full ownership of SBE's Disruptive Restaurant Group Platform (DRG) and its 15 owned restaurant and nightlife venues. It  introduced Mövenpick Living as an extension of Mövenpick brand for extended stay segment.  Also, it announced that it recently entered into negotiations with Ennismore, the company behind brands The Hoxton, Gleneagles, and WorkingFrom, in order to form a large global marketed-lifestyle operator in the hospitality sector. At its inception, the combined entity will comprise 12 brands with 73 hotels in operation worldwide and will take the name Ennismore. Closing occurred 4 October 2021. The company announced its strategic plan to focus on lifestyle hospitality.

In 2021, Accor sealed a partnership with Faena, a company specialized in lifestyle design, introduced the SPAC Accor Acquisition Company (AAC) on the Paris stock exchange, raising 300 million euros to lead investments in hotel-related businesses, sold a 1.5% share in the Chinese hotel management company Huazhu, and invested in the Indian tech hospitality company Treebo. In October 2021, Qatar's Supreme Committee for Delivery & Legacy had signed an agreement with Accor to manage World Cup fan accommodation during the 2022 FIFA World Cup. According to the agreement Accor will provide staff to manage and operate more than 60,000 rooms in apartments and villas.

In September 2021, Accor unveiled its partnership with the carmaker Citroën and the outdoor media company JCDecaux to test urban autonomous cars.

Company

Description 
Accor is a French multinational hospitality company that owns, manages, and franchises hotels, resorts, and vacation properties. It is the single largest hospitality company in Europe and the sixth-largest worldwide. Accor also operates a network of co-working offices located in its hotels and as standalone locations under the Wojo brand.

Accor operates 5,298 locations in over 110 countries, and has over 260,00 employees worldwide. Its total capacity is approximately 777,714 rooms. Luxury (Raffles, Fairmont, Sofitel,...), premium (MGallery, Pullman, Swissôtel,...), midscale (Novotel, Mercure, Adagio,...) and economy (ibis, hotelF1,...). Company and event organization (onefinestay, D-Edge, ResDiary, John Paul, Potel & Chabot,...).

The company is headquartered in Issy-les-Moulineaux, France, and is a constituent of the CAC Next 20 index in the Paris stock exchange.

Brands

Financial results

Management 
Board of directors as of January 2022:

 Sébastien Bazin (chairman and CEO since 2013)
Iris Knobloch (vice-chairman since 2016)
 Aziz Aluthman Fakhroo (director representing the Qatar Investment Authority since 2016)
 Sheikh Nawaf Bin Jassim Bin Jabor Al-Thani (director representing the Qatar Investment Authority since 2017)
 Nicolas Sarkozy (independent director since 2017)

See also
 Accor Stadium
 Accor Arena

References

External links

 
 Company data on Forbes

 
CAC Next 20
Companies based in Paris
Companies listed on Euronext Paris
Companies listed on the London Stock Exchange
French brands
French companies established in 1967
Hospitality companies established in 1967
Hospitality companies of France
Hospitality companies
Multinational companies headquartered in France